Eva Birnerová and Anne Keothavong were the defending champions, but Birnerová chose not to participate. Keothavong partnered up with Tara Moore, but they lost in the semifinals to top seeded Akgul Amanmuradova and Vesna Dolonc. Amanmuradova and Dolonc won the title, defeating Diāna Marcinkēviča and Aliaksandra Sasnovich in the final, 6–3, 6–1.

Seeds

Draw

References 
 Main draw

Aegon GB Pro-Series Barnstaple - Doubles